Elmwood School is a private day school for girls located in Rockcliffe Park in the city of Ottawa, Ontario, Canada. It was founded in 1915 and is an International Baccalaureate World School. Elmwood School was the first school in North America to be accredited for all three levels of the IB Program - the Diploma Programme for students in the final two years of secondary school, the Middle Years Programme (MYP) for students aged 11–16, and the Primary Years Programme (PYP) for students aged 3–12. The school is also a member of the National Coalition of Girls' Schools and the Canadian Accredited Independent Schools.

The faculty provides education to 400 students aged 4 to 18. Classes are small, with an average class size of 12 and a student to teacher ratio of 7:1.  Tuition fees for the 2018–2019 school year are approximately $26,960 for grades 1 to 12 students.  The current Head of School is James Whitehouse, who took over the leadership of the school in 2019 after seven years as Deputy Head of the Middle and Senior School.  Prior to joining Elmwood, he served as Assistant Head at Seven Kings High School in Redbridge, London, United Kingdom.

Like many other private schools throughout the Commonwealth, Elmwood's traditions are based on similar schools in Britain. Senior formal leaders in their graduating year are called prefects, the students wear uniforms, and each student is a member of a house.

Recent graduates have matriculated to universities across Ontario, Canada, the United States, the UK and across the globe.

Each year, over 80% of graduates receive valuable scholarships to post-secondary institutions such as the Greville Smith Scholarship from McGill University, the National Excellence Award from the Canada Millennium Scholarship Foundation, the Sesquicentennial Scholarship from St. Lawrence University in New York State, the Undergraduate Research Scholarship from the University of Ottawa Faculty of Science, the Richard Lewer Scholarship from Carleton University and the President's Entrance Scholarship from the University of Western Ontario to name but a few. In 2010, Elmwood's class of 43 graduates were offered over $1,000,000 in scholarship awards. The largest single scholarship awarded was in 2009, when $150,000 US was awarded to a student.In 2019, the entire graduating class were Ontario Scholars.

Philosophy of education

Elmwood is the only school in Ottawa to offer all three International Baccalaureate programs.  The PYP, MYP and DP offers a continuum of high quality education that encourages international-mindedness and a positive attitude to learning. The three programs form a coherent sequence of education by promoting the education of the whole person through an emphasis on intellectual, personal, emotional and social growth.  The programs are inquiry based and concept driven rather than content driven and are examples of best practices in education.  This approach is based on constructivism learning theory which argues that humans generate knowledge and meaning from their experiences.

In all three programs, the education of the whole person is manifested through all domains of knowledge, involving the major traditions of learning in languages, humanities, sciences, mathematics and the arts.

Facts and statistics
Over the past decade, Elmwood School has excelled in math and science. More than 50% of Elmwood's graduates go on to study math, science and engineering at university. This is significant considering that although women now account for a majority of undergraduate students at Canadian universities, female enrolment in engineering, math and science faculties has never exceeded 20%.

Elmwood has long been recognized as a globally diverse learning community.  Elmwood's students represent more than 30 different nationalities and many say that one of Elmwood's paramount strengths is its diversity and cultural inclusivity.  Elmwood is known for educating children of political and diplomatic figures.  Many diplomatic families choose Elmwood for their daughters' education and there are many links with embassies and consulates located in and around Rockcliffe Park.  Roughly 20% of the student population are members of the diplomatic community.

Academic program
Elmwood's high academic standards, small class sizes and multicultural student base combine to create a unique learning environment. Elmwood's faculty draws on best practices, specific to all girls' education, as they challenge students to be principled, knowledgeable and reflective lifelong learners.

Elmwood regularly surpasses the Ontario Ministry of Education and International Baccalaureate curriculum guidelines and enhances students' learning through field trips, guest speakers, co-curricular activities, and individual opportunities for leadership.

Bilingual certification
Students who follow a prescribed sequence of courses and achieve fluency in both English and French are awarded a Bilingual Certificate. Elmwood also offers opportunities to study Spanish, Latin and Mandarin.

Technology
Elmwood School was one of the first schools in Canada to introduce a 1:1 laptop program in the Senior School.  All students from Grades 9-12 and all faculty have their own personal laptop which they can use to enhance their learning.  Additionally, many classrooms are equipped with a SMART Board and many students are accustomed to the use of technology.  Students in the Junior and Middle Schools use computers in computer labs or utilize mobile laptop carts in the classroom.

Global connections
Elmwood is twinned with St. Charles High School; Seboche, Lesotho. This twinning is helped by the organization Help Lesotho. Alongside being twinned with a school in Africa, Elmwood has two sister schools. Calrossy Anglican School for Girls in Australia and Otago Girls' High School in New Zealand. It is not uncommon to have incoming and outgoing student exchanges.

Athletics
Although Elmwood School is relatively small in size, it has an arguably diverse athletic program.  Teams compete against other Ottawa area schools, both public and private and many teams perform at the highest level.  In 2009 the Senior Girls Basketball team were the Ottawa Tier 1 'A' Champions.  The grade 7/8 volleyball squad took gold at the Ottawa Independent Schools Athletic Association (OISAA) tournament as did the grade 7/8 soccer team. There is also a high participation rate in the athletics program, with occasionally over 70% of girls in Middle School represented the school on a team.

The Junior School has its own Athletics program geared towards the age of its students.  Girls compete against other schools in various competitions including swimming and soccer.  There is also a gymnastics and ballet program offered as an co-curricular activity

Sports offered in Middle and Senior School at Elmwood include, but are not limited to, the following:

 Alpine Ski
 Badminton
 Basketball
 Cross-country
 Field Hockey
 Golf
 Handball
 Rowing
 Rugby
 Soccer
 Snowboarding
 Swimming
 Tennis
 Touch football
 Track & Field
 Ultimate Frisbee
 Volleyball

Duke of Edinburgh Award
Elmwood School has one of the more successful Duke of Edinburgh award programs in Canada.  The Duke of Edinburgh Award is a universally recognized award and the program is considered one of the best programs for the personal development of young people. It is non competitive, available to all and it offers a progression of growth and personal challenge through the categories of Bronze, Silver and Gold.

Elmwood School requires all grade 9 students to participate in the Bronze Award program. The vast majority of students go on to receive their Silver and Gold Awards.  Elmwood School has the highest number of Gold Award recipients per capita in Ontario.

History
Elmwood — originally the Rockcliffe Preparatory School — was founded in 1915 by Theodora Philpot, consisting of only four students, aged four to seven. Philpot was capable of hard work and, even as a respectable married woman with children, had plans that went far beyond her own front door.  She was an entrepreneur, and her dream was to create a great school. Philpot's vision rang true with many parents.  Even in the first few years, there were exponential increases in enrollment.  Within ten years, Elmwood School had a student population of eighty students, served by a faculty of twelve teachers.

After founding the school, Theodora Philpot retired to England leaving Elmwood in the hands of Edith Buck.  She donated a Bible Box, inscribed with the words "Pactum Serva" meaning "Keep the Faith" to the school, and it came with a plea to carry on the work she had started.

Modern methods, academic excellence, personal development and strong school spirit are still the ideal cornerstones of the Elmwood experience.

School symbol
The daffodil is the symbol of Elmwood School. Inspired by a poem by William Wordsworth, I Wandered Lonely as a Cloud also known as Daffodils, the founding Headmistress, Theodora Philpot, adopted it for the Philpot Token Award. Each year, the student who embodies the spirit and ideals of service, fellowship, freedom and fair play is presented with this award.

School hymn
The school hymn is a modified version of To be a Pilgrim by John Bunyan.

Elmwood Centennial 1915–2015
The Elmwood School's centennial celebrations (1915–2015) consisted of a Centennial 'Kick Off' celebration on the first day of school (Sept 9, 2015), a Founder's Day celebration (Oct 2, 3, and 4, 2015), a Homecoming weekend for alumnae and current members of our community (Oct 2, 3, and 4, 2015) as well as a Centennial Finale after closing ceremonies on June 17, 2016. In addition, Elmwood held a special Centennial Gala (April 16, 2016) as well as a special Centennial Holly Tea and a Centennial Father Daughter Dinner Dance (Feb 6, 2016). A photographic exhibition was positioned around the school permanently. The Elmwood School history book, 'Voices,' previously written for our 85th anniversary, was updated to include events 2000–2015. The yearbooks were digitized and the oldest yearbooks were preserved.

Elmwood coat of arms
The centennial committee worked with the Chief Herald at the Governor General's office to create an Elmwood Coat of Arms. Her Excellency Sharon Johnston unveiled the coat of arms of Elmwood School, on Thursday, May 7, 2015, at 9:15 a.m., at Elmwood School. The symbol represents Elmwood's proud tradition as well as looks forward to its future. "This year, Elmwood is celebrating its centennial. I'm delighted to take part in the celebrations by unveiling a very important symbol that speaks to the school's rich history, values and traditions," said Her Excellency.

Notable alumnae
Many Elmwood students have gone on to have remarkable careers and successful lives.  Canada's first female Senator, Cairine Wilson, attended the school and was Head Girl in her final year.  The school's Wilson House is named in her honour.  Canadian television broadcaster Catherine Clark, daughter of the Right Honourable Joe Clark, also attended Elmwood.  Poet Elizabeth Smart, author of the prose poem 'By Grand Central Station I Sat Down and Wept', attended Elmwood from 1922–1929.  Children's television writer, Mary MacKay-Smith attended Elmwood in the mid-1960s and was Head of Nightingale House.  MacKay-Smith has written for many children's television series including Caillou and Polka Dot Door.  Gemini Award-winning Canadian screenwriter Tassie Cameron spent her formative years at Elmwood.  She is currently a writer and co-executive producer on the hit CBS/CTV television series Rookie Blue.  Tassie and her sister Amy created the 2009 CBC television series Wild Roses. Mimi Lee, an American chemist, served as First Lady of Maryland from 1977 to 1979.

Over the years, Elmwood has admitted boys in its early years program, many of which attend Ashbury College in high school.  Actor Hume Cronyn, Adrian Harewood (host of Ottawa's afternoon program All In A Day), and entrepreneur Ben Barry are all examples of such 'Old Boys' of Elmwood.

Traditions
There are many strong traditions that have been upheld at Elmwood over the years.  One of the most striking traditions is the practice of the Grade 12 graduates wearing white dresses to their Closing (Graduation) Ceremony rather than the black caps and gowns found at other schools.  The graduates traditionally have their photograph taken on the staircase in the Front Hall, the oldest part of the school.

The Rose Ceremony is a more recent graduate tradition.  Each year a girl in Grade 12 is given a rose by a student in Grade 11.  At this time, the graduate's accomplishments and contributions to the school are celebrated through a short testimonial given by a Grade 11 student.   If the graduate has a sister in a younger grade, the sister is permitted to make the presentation.

Another tradition which has existed for over 20 years is the annual Father Daughter Dinner Dance.  This formal event takes place in February and gives Elmwood fathers and their daughters in Grades 6-12 an opportunity to socialize with each other and celebrate the bond between father and daughter.  More recently a Mother Daughter weekend has also been added to the social calendar as well as a Junior School Tea for Elmwood's youngest students.

House system
Elmwood students are divided into four Houses, each named after a prominent and inspirational woman in history: Elizabeth Fry, Helen Keller, Florence Nightingale and Cairine Wilson.

Fry
Bio: Elizabeth Fry (1740–1845) is remembered for her pioneering work in prison reform in Britain. She was chosen by the students in 1927 "because of the great work she did among the poor and unfortunate and in the prisons... In this house the aim is to follow her example of love to all humanity and to try to have some of her courage and determination to do the right thing."
Motto: Societas Huamana – Friendship for All
Pin: circle, with a red letter "F" on a white background
Symbol: Gold star
Colour: Red and Gold
Charity: Humane Society

Keller
Bio: After a childhood illness, Helen Keller (1880–1968) became both deaf and blind. Despite her handicap, she made phenomenal progress learning to communicate with the outside world. Her determination and success paved the way for other handicapped people to find hope and help in their struggle to achieve success as well.
Motto: Fair Play
Pin: Diamond, with a green letter "K" on a yellow background
Symbol: Paw print
Colour: Light blue and White
Charity: Canadian Guide Dogs for the Blind

Nightingale
Bio: Florence Nightingale (1820–1910) was well schooled having studied Greek, Latin, French, German, and Italian, history, philosophy and mathematics. In adulthood she became a nurse and is best known for her struggle to improve the quality of nursing care of the sick and wounded soldiers during the Crimean War.
Motto: Non Nobis Solum – Not for Ourselves Alone
Pin: circle, with a navy blue letter "N" on a white background
Symbol: Anchor
Colour: Navy blue and Silver
Charity: Make A Wish Foundation

Wilson
Bio: Cairine Wilson (1885–1962) was named Canada's first woman senator on February 20, 1930. A leader in Women's Liberal clubs and youth groups, President of the Canadian League of Nations Society, Chair of the Canadian National Committee on Refugees and a delegate to the United Nations. Cairine Wilson attended Elmwood School and was "head girl" in her graduating year.
Motto: To Give Ourselves and Never Count the Cost for Others' Greater Need
Pin: " W" shape, with a green letter on a yellow background
Symbol: Banana
Colour: Yellow and Purple
Charity: Boys & Girls Clubs of Canada

Each student is placed in a House upon entering the school and stays in that house until graduation.

House meetings are held regularly during assembly period. House games are held during the lunch hour. The Spirit Afternoon in the fall and Sports Day in the spring are structured around House teams. Attendance at all House activities is compulsory.

Houses also choose a program of social service each year and are responsible for designing and carrying out fund-raising activities.

References

External links

 Elmwood School website

Girls' schools in Canada
Private schools in Ottawa
Elementary schools in Ottawa
Middle schools in Ottawa
High schools in Ottawa
International Baccalaureate schools in Ontario
Educational institutions established in 1915
1915 establishments in Ontario